Mary Esther is a city in Okaloosa County, Florida, United States. The population was 3,851 at the 2010 census. It is part of the Fort Walton Beach–Crestview–Destin Metropolitan Statistical Area.

Etymology

Mary Esther gets its name from its first postmaster, John Newton, who named it for his daughters.

Geography

U.S. Route 98 is the main route through the city, leading east 4 mi (6 km) to Fort Walton Beach and west 37 mi (60 km) to Pensacola.

Climate
Climate is characterized by relatively high temperatures and evenly distributed precipitation throughout the year. This climate type is found on the eastern sides of the continents between 20° and 35° N and S latitude.  The Köppen Climate Classification subtype for this climate is "Cfa" (Humid Subtropical Climate).

Demographics

At the 2000 census there were 4,055 people in 1,623 households, including 1,147 families, in the city. The racial makeup of the city was 83.65% White, 6.46% African American, 0.96% Native American, 3.77% Asian, 0.17% Pacific Islander, 1.21% from other races, and 3.77% from two or more races. Hispanic or Latino of any race were 4.09%.

Of the 1,623 households 29.0% had children under the age of 18 living with them, 57.0% were married couples living together, 9.9% had a female householder with no husband present, and 29.3% were non-families. 21.7% of households were one person and 7.0% were one person aged 65 or older. The average household size was 2.50 and the average family size was 2.93.

The age distribution was 23.4% under the age of 18, 7.8% from 18 to 24, 30.5% from 25 to 44, 25.1% from 45 to 64, and 13.3% 65 or older. The median age was 39 years. For every 100 females, there were 102.3 males. For every 100 females age 18 and over, there were 100.1 males.

The median household income was $42,647 and the median family income  was $47,917. Males had a median income of $31,030 versus $20,319 for females. The per capita income for the city was $22,488. About 4.1% of families and 5.7% of the population were below the poverty line, including 8.8% of those under age 18 and 1.0% of those age 65 or over.

Libraries 
The idea of a public library was first proposed on February 4, 1974 to the then Mayor Tom Pryor. The library was first named the Mary Esther Community Library. It was run by volunteers and not tax supported. The original building was only 585 square feet, with annual fees ranging from $1.00 per person to $5.00 for a family. The building was later able to get an expansion to 810 square feet. The Mary Esther Community Library was then renamed in October of 1976 to the current name of the Mary Esther Public Library. In 1988 when the space for the library was deemed too small, the Friends of the Library group created a petition for the citizens calling on the City Council to build a newer, bigger library. On February 6, 1989 the City Council approved the new site and size of the library. While the new library was being built the state of Florida also elected to give $175,000 dollars in matching funds to help with construction. Ground was broken on February 28, 1991, and the new Mary Esther Public Library opened to the public on March 9, 1992. Throughout the history of the Mary Esther Public Library there was talk of an Okaloosa County Library System, but it was repeatedly denied. The Okaloosa County Public Library Cooperative eventually formed in 1997 with Mary Esther as one of the member libraries. The library received its most recent renovation in 2004 after receiving a $350,000 grant, adding an additional 2,000 square feet.

References

External links

 City of Mary Esther
 Northwest Florida Daily News

Cities in Okaloosa County, Florida
Populated places on the Intracoastal Waterway in Florida
Populated places established in 1838
Cities in Florida
1838 establishments in Florida Territory